St. Catherine's Roman Catholic Church was a catholic church in Riga, the capital of Latvia. The church was situated at the address 9/11 Šķūņu Street.

References 

Roman Catholic churches in Riga
Roman Catholic churches in Latvia